Absolute is the sixth album released by the Japanese metal band Aion. The album consists of traditional heavy metal, contrasting sharply with the power metal and thrash metal early in their career, but it was a transition slowly seen throughout their releases. Exactly 7 days before the album's release, the single "Missing" came out to promote it. Oddly, a promotional video for the single's B-side "Killer" was made, but there was never an official promotional video, based on Absolute.

Track listing

Personnel
Nov – vocals
Izumi – lead and rhythm guitars
Dean – bass guitar
Shu – drums

References

1994 albums
Aion (Japanese band) albums